The 2012 Challenge Casino de Charlevoix was held from November 22 to 25 at the Aréna de Clermont and the Club de curling Nairn in Clermont, Quebec as part of the 2012–13 World Curling Tour. The event is being held in a triple knockout format, and the purse for the event is CAD$37,000, of which the winner will receive CAD$12,000. In the final, Peter de Cruz of Switzerland defeated Brad Jacobs of Ontario in an extra end with a score of 6–5.

Teams
The teams are listed as follows:

Knockout results
The draw is listed as follows:

A event

B event

C event

Playoffs
The playoffs draw is listed as follows:

References

External links

2012 in curling